The following is a list of public holidays in Peru.

Former holidays

References

 
Peru
Holidays